The 2008–09 Syrian Premier League is the 38th season of the Syrian Premier League, Syria's premier football league. The season began on 10 October 2008 and finished on 12 June 2009.

Afrin and Al-Horriya were relegated from the previous season.
Al-Wathba and Omyyah moved up from the Syrian League 1st Division.

At the end of the campaign, defending champions Al-Karamah were level on 52 points with Al-Ittihad and therefore were required to have a one off playoff match to determine the league champions.

Al-Futowa and Hutteen were relegated and would be replaced by Afrin and Al-Jazeera for the 2009–10 Syrian Premier League campaign.

Syrian international Mohamed Al Zeno finished the campaign as leading goalscorer with 17 goals.

Continental Cups

AFC Cup

Al-Karamah and Al-Majd entered the AFC Cup 2009 tournament. A tournament for second ranked Asian nations.

During the domestic Syrian league season, only the group phases of this prestigious tournament is played until the knockout rounds which will take place in the next Syrian season.

Al-Majd comfortably qualified with one game to spare to reach the knockout rounds whilst Al-Karamah had somewhat of a shaky start and after 5 games find themselves in 3rd position.

Arab Champions League

Al-Ittihad and Al-Taliya entered the Arab Champions League but Al-Taliya found the going tough, being thumped by Raja Casablanca of Morocco in the first round.

Al-Ittihad went one round better but  got beat by Wydad Casablanca, also of Morocco.

Premier League teams (2008–2009)

Final league standings

Playoffs

5th and 6th placed teams Al-Wathba and Al-Majd had a one match playoff at the end of the season due to both clubs finishing the regular season on 37 points. Al-Wathba won the tie 3–2 to claim 5th position in the final standings.

Championship match

MATCH OFFICIALS
 Assistant referees:
 Fayez Al Basha (Syria)
 Hamdi Al Kadrie (Syria)
 Fourth official:
 Mohamad Baderaldin (Syria)

MATCH RULES
 90 minutes.
 30 minutes of extra time if necessary.
 Penalty shootout if scores still level.
 Seven named substitutes.
 Maximum of 3 substitutions.

Winner

Top goalscorers
17 goals
  Mohamed Al Zeno (Al-Majd)

14 goals
  Abdul Fattah Al Agha (Al-Ittihad)

12 goals
  Ibrahim Al Hasan (Jableh)
  Omar Al Soma (Al-Futowa)

11 goals
  Maher Al Sayed (Al-Wahda)
  Ali Ghalium (Al-Wathba)
  Samer Yazji (Omayya)
  Obode Efe (Teshrin)

10 goals
  Majed Al Haj (Al-Jaish)
  Anas Sari (Al-Ittihad)
  Oday Al-Jafal (Al-Futowa)
  Amar Zakour (Omayya)

Managerial changes

References

External links
 Details at fifa.com
 Details at goalzz.com
 Details at rsssf.com
 Details at soccerway.com

Syrian Premier League seasons
1
Syria